Now Soldiers was a melodic hardcore punk band from Clearwater, Florida. Between 2003 and 2008, Now Soldiers played many shows including a few brief east coast tours and a full United States tour in 2006. The band's only official release was the EP, Sick World, released on Significant Records in 2006. Enduring a name change and many lineup changes, Now Soldiers played their final show at The 688 Skate Park on June 20, 2008.

Final lineup 

Austin Thomas- Guitar Vocals (2002–2008)
Joseph "Poey" Gordon - Guitar (2002–2008)
Vincent Caffiero - Drums (2002–2008)
Tyler Toth - Vocals (2005–2008)
Ben Sharp - Bass guitar (2006–2008)

Former members
 Christopher Galbraith - bass guitar (2002–2006)
 Randon Martin - bass guitar (summer tour with Barriers Now Bridges 2006)
 Phillip Horne - vocals (2005)

Discography 
 Sick World - 2006 on Significant Records

External links 
 Significant Records Myspace Page
 Official Now Soldiers Myspace Page

References 

Hardcore punk groups from Florida
Musical groups established in 2002
Musical groups disestablished in 2008